Herbert Barnes, MA (1833–1890) was Archdeacon of Barnstaple from 1885 to 1890. He was also Treasurer and Canon of Exeter Cathedral.

He was the son of George Barnes, and was educated at Christ Church, Oxford, graduating B.A. in 1855. He marries Charlotte Kitson, in Madras.

References

Archdeacons of Barnstaple
Alumni of Christ Church, Oxford
1833 births
1890 deaths